Qeysar (also Romanized as Qeyşār and Qaisar) is a village in Sedeh Rural District, Sedeh District, Qaen County, South Khorasan Province, Iran. At the 2006 census, its population was 111, in 31 families.

References 

Populated places in Qaen County